Irlam was an electoral ward of Salford, England.  It was represented in Westminster by the constituency of Worsley and Eccles South. A profile of the ward conducted by Salford City Council in 2014 recorded a population of 9,857.

Councillors 
Between 2004 and 2021 the ward was represented by three councillors, each being elected for a term of four years.

 indicates seat up for re-election.

The ward was abolished at the 2021 Salford City Council election, and was replaced by two new wards: Cadishead and Lower Irlam and Higher Irlam and Peel Green.

Elections in 2010s

May 2019

May 2018

May 2016

May 2015

May 2014

May 2012

May 2011

May 2010

Elections in 2000s

References 

Salford City Council Wards